Butylamines are several related chemical compounds:

 n-Butylamine
 sec-Butylamine
 tert-Butylamine
 Isobutylamine